Shildon railway works opened in 1833 in the town of Shildon in County Durham, England. Originally built to serve the Stockton and Darlington Railway the works grew to cover  ( roofed), employing 2750 staff.

History 
Shildon was the terminus of the Stockton & Darlington Railway (S&DR), when it opened in 1825.  Its first locomotive superintendent was Timothy Hackworth, who maintained their locomotives at the Soho Works. Thomas Hackworth (Timothy's brother) was works manager at the Soho Works.

The beginnings of the works were small - 

In 1827, Timothy Hackworth built the locomotive Royal George at the Soho Works. It was also in this period that the works received an order from the Tsar of Russia for a locomotive. Shildon produced the engine and Hackworth's son John Wesley Hackworth was dispatched with drivers and mechanics to deliver it to Russia.

These works were to be purchased by the S&DR company in 1855 and closed in 1883. Hackworth was the first of 22 managers of the works in their 151-year history, a post he held between 1833 and 1840. 

A trade union was formed in 1899 after growing discontent amongst the workers. One of the grievances was a requirement to work overtime. An average working day was 11 hours, 06.00 to 17.00, with overtime taking the working day to 21.00. The men were told that their 'boards' would not be issued for the Saturday shift if they refused the overtime. The boards were where the men recorded their work, without their board they could not work.

In 1962 the Shildon Works underwent a £800,000 modernisation following the creation of the British Rail Workshops Division. This saw the works equipped to repair BR wagons and from 1970, wagons from abroad. A notable wagon which came out of the works on this period was the 'Presflo' air-discharge cement wagon along with high capacity coal and Freightliner wagons. The forge at Shildon also produced a large proportion of drop stampings for other railway works.

The works repair shop had the capacity to overhaul and repair 800 wagons a week. Production figures show that between 1965 and 1982 the works build 11,083 'Merry-go-round' 32.5 tonne capacity coal hoppers.

Campaign to Save the Works and Closure

1982 
The closure of the works was announced on 23 April 1982 by British Rail Engineering Ltd (BREL).

At the time of the announcement the works employed 2,600 people and amounted to 86% of the male workforce's manufacturing jobs in the town.

Eight days before the announcement of the closure there were rumours that it may come.

With negotiations under way local journalists reported being hung up on when trying to call union officials at the works. These negotiations received a blow on 17 April, when works National Union of Railwaymen (NUR) chair Roy Jones collapsed on his way to work from a suspected stroke. He was in London for negotiations on 13 and 14 April and the strain is believed to have caused the stroke.

Interviewed in 1990, Sidney Weighell (General Sec. NUR) recalled first hearing of the closure plan - 

A trade union march was organised for 29 April, which was to assemble at 10am on the playing field of Sunnydale School. Members of the Sedgefield District Council closure working party were authorised to attend as 'approved duty' with pay. The march worked its way through the town, led by figures including Derek Foster MP and Roland Boyes MEP, to the local football ground.
BREL set out its case for closure in a special edition of Railtalk Magazine using a question and answer format.

On 5 May a joint report by Durham and Sedgefield Councils' planning departments was issued. It stated that closure would result in the loss of 2,180 jobs and leave one in four of the "insured population in the Bishop Auckland Employment Exchange area" unemployed. A further 450 jobs with suppliers to the works would also be lost.

At 19.30 on the evening of 7 May a trades union meeting was held in the works canteen to discuss progress in the campaign to save the facility. A strike was discussed but "Derby were lukewarm, but Glasgow suggested an immediate strike because of fears that there would be a dwindling of workshops". A protest to London was thought to be a better idea and a train chartered to take people to the capital. Ultimately it was decided that travellers would pay £5 each with the remaining amount coming from the fighting fund.

In his 1990 interview Weighell recalled the Shildon branch of the NUR -  

Dennis Lees arrived as acting manager of the works on 10 May, replacing Derek Clarke who had been made acting manager at the Doncaster facility.

On 25 May a deputation left the for London with 600 people travelling south in eleven coaches from Darlington at 07.15 bound for Kings Cross. Arriving at 11.00 the party marched on the British Rail (BR) headquarters. There they delivered 630 letters to the chairman of BR Sir Peter Parker. They moved on to the Houses of Parliament to lobby members of parliament before returning to Kings Cross and arriving back at Darlington at 22.20.

On 29 May there was a large rally in Shildon with marchers moving off from the Civic Hall to the park at 10.30 and speeches beginning at 11.15. Official guests included Albert Booth MP (Shadow Minister for Transport), Derek Foster MP (Constituency MP), Jack Cunningham MP (Chair. Labour Northern Group of MPs), Ted Fletcher and Roland Boyes MEP (Constituency MEP).

An official at the rally recalled the day - 

On the same day the Northern Echo reported that Prime Minister Margaret Thatcher was to meet with local MP Derek Foster to discuss the Shildon closure plan.

On 4 June BR announced a postponement of the closure with a decision to come in early 1983 on the future of the works. Union leaders at a local level said they "delighted that our industrial strength has brought about a change of attitude." However, the NUR leaders in London were more cautious that a postponement was not a reprieve. A local newspaper did not draw this distinction and declared - 

The proposed Channel Tunnel came up for discussion at a meeting of the Works Working Party on 24 June and the need for wagons for the new tunnel.

On 18 August acting works manager Dennis Lees wrote to all staff - 

The Daily Mirror ran a two-page spread about the town on 4 October - 

In December 1982 the Association of District Councils (ADC) reported that BR wagons at that time carrying scrap metal were to be 'life-expired and withdrawn from service by May 1984'''. This announcement resulted in discussions at the Policy and Resources Committee of Sedgefield District Council on 13 December. There it was pointed out that the withdrawal of these wagons would put a serve strain on road haulage resources. It became clear that some local authorities were to replace the withdrawn wagons and apply for railway facilities under provisions of the Railways Act 1974 (Section 8). The act allowed for private or public industry to build their own access to sidings on the rail network. Hopes that these new wagons would be built at Shildon were soon dashed, with the Policy Resource Committee reporting - 

Any new wagons for the movement of scrap metal in areas that would be adversely impacted by an increase in road haulage were to be built by private industry.

 1983 
J. Palette (Dir. of Personnel, British Rail Board) confirmed the closure of Shildon Works in 1984. In a letter to unions on 18 February 1983 he stated that work would be transferred from the town to work in Doncaster and other BREL sites.

The Works Joint Committee gathered on 4 March to discuss the closure announcement. Local MP Derek Foster believed that the campaign to save the works had been a "tremendous achievement" but that it had made little difference to the outcome. Some regarded the meeting as a wake for the works while others wanted to redouble efforts and continue to campaign.

In June, Minister for Trade and Industry Norman Lamont wrote to Councillor G. W. Terrans (Leader, Durham County Council Labour Group) - 

Sedgefield District Council appreciated the need for government grants and subsidies to encourage new industries into the area. These incentives were dependent on the Department for Trade and Industry (DTI) classification. The council were seeking to upgrade their area from an Assisted Area (AA) to a Special Development Area (SDA).

The Evening Despatch reported in August 1983 - 

 1984 
Labour leader Neil Kinnock MP visited Shildon on 28 April 1984 and spoke on the situation - 

An announcement came that the works would officially close on 30 June 1984.

BREL offered the town a £300,000 loan guarantee package but this was thought to be not enough. Then on 7 June, David Mitchell (Parliamentary Under Sec. Dept. of Transport) set up a group at the ministry to try and reach agreement on an improved offer.

The taking up of the railway lines linking the works to the network were reported by the Northern Echo on 25 June - 

 References 

Sources
 Simmons, J., (1986) The Railway in Town and Country, Newton Abott: David and Charles
 Larkin, E.J., Larkin, J.G., (1988) The Railway Workshops of Great Britain 1823-1986,'' Macmillan Press

External links
 North East History: The Stockton and Darlington Railway

Stockton and Darlington Railway
Railway workshops in Great Britain
North Eastern Railway (UK)
1825 establishments in England
Shildon